Tselfatia is an extinct genus of Cretaceous bony fish. Originally described from (and named after) Djebl Tselfat in Morocco, it has since been discovered at sites in several other countries (Texas/USA, Germany, Mexico, Italy and the former Yugoslavia). The type species, Tselfatia formosa, was named and described in 1944 by French paleontologist Camille Arambourg. A second species, T. dalmatica, was named in 1980 from the Dalmatian Coast of Yugoslavia.

The enormous dorsal fin as well as the large anal fin both feature one much enlarged ray, characteristic for the genus. These fish are never common and more work needs to be done on the known specimens.

References

External links
 Bony fish in the online Sepkoski Database

Tselfatiiformes
Fossil taxa described in 1944